"Ain't No Trick (It Takes Magic)" is a song written by Jim Hurt and Steve Pippin, and recorded by the American country music artist Lee Greenwood. It was released in December 1982 as the fourth single from the album Inside Out. The song reached #7 on the Billboard Hot Country Singles & Tracks chart.

Chart performance

References

1983 singles
Lee Greenwood songs
MCA Records singles
Songs written by Jim Hurt
Song recordings produced by Jerry Crutchfield
1982 songs